Shiha (in Arabic شيحة or شيحا) is an Arabic-based surname perhaps could mean the bitter herbaceous plant wormwood, used in fragrances and medicines. 

It may refer to:

Places
Al-Shiha, a Syrian village located in the Masyaf Subdistrict in Masyaf District, located west of Hama
Shihat Hama, or just Shiha or al-Shyha, a village in northwestern Syria, administratively part of the Hama Governorate
Shihat al-Hamraa, a Syrian village located in Al-Hamraa Nahiyah in Hama District, Hama

People with the surname
Essam Shiha, Egyptian lawyer, politician and human rights activist
Hala Shiha (born 1979), Egyptian actress
Hana Shiha (born 1979), Egyptian actress
Jana Shiha (born 2001), Egyptian squash player

See also
Chiha, a variant (francicized version) of Shiha or Sheeha 
Shia (disambiguation)